Eden Ben-Menashe ( born August 17, 1995) is an Israeli footballer who plays for F.C. Dimona.

References

External links
 

1995 births
Living people
Israeli footballers
Maccabi Netanya F.C. players
Hapoel Hod HaSharon F.C. players
Hapoel Pardesiya F.C. players
Hapoel Asi Gilboa F.C. players
Hapoel Ashdod F.C. players
Hapoel Migdal HaEmek F.C. players
Hapoel Herzliya F.C. players
Hapoel Ramat Gan F.C. players
F.C. Tira players
F.C. Holon Yermiyahu players
F.C. Dimona players
Liga Leumit players
Footballers from Netanya
Association football defenders